Miguel Ángel Noro (born 22 August 1961) is a Bolivian footballer. He played in 13 matches for the Bolivia national football team from 1985 to 1993. He was also part of Bolivia's squad for the 1987 Copa América tournament.

References

External links
 

1961 births
Living people
Bolivian footballers
Bolivia international footballers
Association football defenders
People from Vaca Díez Province
Oriente Petrolero players
Club Blooming players